"Principal's Office" is a 1989 single by Young M.C. It is the follow-up single to his international hit, Bust a Move. The music video for the song was nominated for Best Rap Video at the 1990 MTV Video Music Awards.

Charts

Weekly charts

Year-end charts

References

1989 singles
1989 songs
Songs written by Young MC
Music videos directed by Tamra Davis